William Nicholl (30 October 1868 – 10 April 1922) was a rugby union, and professional rugby league footballer who played in the 1890s. He played representative level rugby union (RU) for England and Yorkshire, and at club level for Brighouse Rangers, in the Forwards, and club level rugby league (RL) for Brighouse Rangers, as a forward (prior to the specialist positions of), during the era of contested scrums. He played in all forward positions for Yorkshire. He continued to play for Brighouse Rangers after they became a founding a member of the Northern Union in 1895.

Background
William Nicholl was born in Rastrick, West Riding of Yorkshire, England, and he died aged 53 in Brighouse, West Riding of Yorkshire, England.

International honours

William Nicholl won two caps for England while at Brighouse Rangers in the 1892 Home Nations Championship against Wales, and Scotland.

Post Rugby
After finishing his rugby career he took up bowls, winning the 1912 Brighouse and District bowling championships.

References

External links

Search for "Nicholl" at rugbyleagueproject.org

1868 births
1922 deaths
Brighouse Rangers players
England international rugby union players
English rugby league players
English rugby union players
Footballers who switched code
People from Brighouse
People from Rastrick
Rugby league forwards
Rugby league players from Yorkshire
Rugby union forwards
Rugby union players from Yorkshire
Yorkshire County RFU players